Craig Pilo (né Craig M. Pilo; born 21 April 1972 Connecticut) is an American drummer who has performed with Frankie Valli & the Four Seasons, Maynard Ferguson, Edgar Winter, Deniece Williams, Pat Boone, the Red Elvises, and Player. The Los Angeles Music Awards named Pilo "Best Jazz Artist of 2007" for his debut album, Just Play.

Career 
Pilo received his bachelor's degree in drum performance from the University of North Texas College of Music in 1995, and soon began touring with trumpeter Maynard Ferguson on the "One More Trip To Birdland" Tour. Pilo's film & TV music department credits as drummer: Ally McBeal, Sex and the City, CSI: Miami, Malcolm in the Middle, Sabrina, The Osbournes, Basic, Boston Public, and Dirty Dancing: Havana Nights.

Pilo's mentors include Alan Dawson, Ed Soph, Dave Weckl, and Jeff Hamilton.

Pilo has performed internationally and coast-to-coast in North America.  One such notable performance was with Frankie Valli, in a PBS/NPR special, A Capitol Fourth, July 4, 2014, from the United States Capitol, which had an attendance of 300,000 and a television audience of 6 million. Pilo has released three solo albums: Just Play (2007), Unsupervised (2011), and Drummer Boy (2014). He has written on the music industry for Modern Drummer magazine, and currently teaches drum performance and music business at the California College of Music.

Selected discography 
 As leader

This-n-That (released 1997)
Craig Pilo, Inc.

Just Play (released May 1, 2007)
Roman Dudok, Doug Webb (soprano sax), Mitchel Forman (electric piano), Ed Czach (keyboards), Bart Somelis, Keith Hubacher, Tom Kennedy, Jim King, David Enos, Jonathan Pintoff (bass) Craig Pilo (drums), Byron Brock (bongos)
Recorded in 2008, Reseda, California
Rue De La Harpe Records 3 (CD)

Unsupervised (released March 21, 2011)
Craig Pilo (drums), Jim King (bass), Ed Czach (keyboards), Bill Esparza, Chris Smith, Rick Baptist, Mitch Forman, Angela Carole Brown, Brandon Brigham
Rue De La Harpe Records

Fused (released November 1, 2011)
Pilo is co-leader with
Rick Keller (né Richard H. Keller, Jr.)
Saxsonic Records

Guitar Jam (released March 1, 2013)
Craig Pilo, Ken Rosser, Drew Zingg (born 1957; son of photographer David Drew Zingg), Jim Henken, Steve Gregory, Andrew Synoweic (né Brian Andrew Synowiec; born 1975)
Available free online at 

Drummer Boy (released 2014) (holiday jazz)
Chris Smith, Bart Samolis, Mitch Forman, Ric Fierabracci, Robby Robinson, Rex Robinson
Rue De La Harpe Records

 As bandmember or sideman

Slow Club Quartet (jazz)
Expressionism (released 2008)
Ed Czach (piano), Angela Carole Brown (vocals), Craig Pilo (drums), Don Kasper (bass)
Rue de la Harpe Records

Player (rock band)
Too Many Reasons (2013)
Peter Beckett (lead vocals, guitar, keyboards), Ronn Moss (lead vocals, bass), Rob Math (guitar), Michael Hakes (died 2003) (guitar), Michael Parnell (bass, drums, keyboards), J.C. Love (aka Johnny English, aka Jawn Starr) (keyboards), Steve Plunkett (drums), Craig Pilo (drums)
Frontiers Records FR CD 589

Paul Kantner
A Martian Christmas
United States of Distribution

Notes

References
Inline citations

External links
Craig Pilo official website
Craig Pilo Facebook page
Craig Pilo Twitter page
Craig Pilo Instagram page

1972 births
Living people
American jazz musicians
University of North Texas College of Music alumni
20th-century American drummers
American male drummers
21st-century American drummers
20th-century American male musicians
21st-century American male musicians
American male jazz musicians